In the Mind of... is an interview program broadcast in Canada on The Biography Channel and Bravo! It is an interview program where the guest is asked a set of questions from an established pool of questions.

Taffi Rosen is the creator of In the Mind of.... Rosen's production company, RedHead Entertainment, produces the show.

The series has aired 120 interviews to date and continues forward in 2007.

Interview guests

David Hoestetler
Stephan Rousseau
Holly Cole
Veronica Tennant
Kim Mitchell
Marnie McBean
Colin Mochrie
Erica Jong
John Shea
Charles Pachter
Juliette Powell
Corky Laing
Peter Tork
Paul Roberts
Jane Siberry
Bruce Mau
Sass Jordan
Diane Chase
Ronnie Hawkins
Les Paul
David Fishof
Carla Collins
Marc Jordan
Mackenzie Gray
Sean Cullen
Melleny Melody
Monica McKenna
Harry Lewis
Collette Baron Reid
Charlotte Moore
Jack Diamond
Bret Hart
June Callwood
Warren Haynes
Roger Hill
Laura Day
Ben Mulroney
Sheila Copps
Earl Pastko
Peter Oundjian
Daniel Richler
Dolores O'Riordan
David Suzuki
Don Ferguson
Deepa Mehta
John Neville
Scott Thompson
Moshe Safdie
John Greyson
Robert Landry
Sandy Hawley
Gilbert Rozen
Amy Sky
Clive A. Smith
Bram Morrison
Rachel Perry
Brad Fraser
Melba Moore
Oren Safdie
Clara Urban
Mump and Smoot
Clarence Ford
Marilyn Lightstone
Bernie Finkelstein
Penny Buitenhaus
Steve Patterson
Mendelson Joe
Paula Lishman
Alexander McCall Smith
Bill Lishman
Liona Boyd
Leslie West

External links 
 In the Mind of...
 In the Mind of on Bravo!

2000s Canadian television talk shows